Maurice FitzGerald, 6th Duke of Leinster (1 March 1887 – 4 February 1922), was the eldest son of the 5th Duke of Leinster and his wife, the former Lady Hermione Wilhelmina Duncombe, a daughter of The 1st Earl of Feversham.

Biography
Born at Kilkea Castle and never married but was educated at Eton College, he acceded to the dukedom and its related titles upon his father's death from typhoid fever in 1893, at age 42; his mother died of tuberculosis in 1895, at age 30.

The Duke had three siblings:
A sister (born 1885 – died 5 February 1886)
Lord Desmond FitzGerald (1888–1916)
Edward FitzGerald, 7th Duke of Leinster (1892–1976), whose biological father it has been alleged was The 11th Earl of Wemyss.

During his minority, his family's large estates in County Kildare were sold in November 1903 by his trustees to 506 tenant farmers via the Land Commission. Some of the lands had a title dating back to the Norman invasion of Ireland in 1171. The 45,000 acres sold for £766,000, a huge amount at the time, but this had to cover costs, some mortgages and £272,000 that was earmarked to family trusts for the surviving younger children of the 4th duke.

Mental illness and death

The 6th Duke was reported to be in delicate health from childhood onwards and, the day before he turned 21, in 1908, a newspaper observed that he was "little known in London", due to the "careful way in which he has been obliged to live". Actually, the young Duke was, at the time, a patient at Craig House Hospital, a psychiatric institution, in Edinburgh, Midlothian, Scotland; there he lived in his own villa, attended by a butler, from 1907 until his death in 1922.

From 1908 until death John Donald Pollock served as his personal physician and confidant.

Ancestry

References

Maurice
1887 births
1922 deaths
People from County Kildare
19th-century Irish people
Dukes of Leinster (1766)